England replaced Great Britain in competing in the Rugby League Four Nations which replaced the previous Tri Nations tournament. They have been runners up twice in 2009 and 2011, these two tournaments also having been hosted by England.

Results

Tournaments

England and France 2009

Rugby League Four Nations